Wilco is a Dutch masculine given name, combining "Wil" from Willem ("William") and the -co or -ko ending common for nicknames in the province of Groningen. The name became relatively popular in the Netherlands after 1960. An alternative spelling is Wilko. People with the name include:

Wilco
 Wilco Kelderman (born 1991), Dutch road bicycle racer
 Wilco van Kleef (born 1981), half of the tallest married couple 
 Wilco Louw (born 1994), South African rugby player
 Wilco Melissant (born 1968), Dutch television director
 (born 1967), Dutch mountaineer and adventurer
 Wilco Zeelenberg (born 1966), Dutch motorcycle racer and team manager
 Wilco Zuijderwijk (born 1969), Dutch track cyclist
Wilko
 Wilko Johnson (born 1947), English musician
 Wilko Risser (born 1982), Namibian-German footballer
 Wilko de Vogt (born 1975), Dutch football goalkeeper
Fictional characters
 Wilco (Star Wars), a clone captain in the season 2 premiere of Star Wars: The Bad Batch

References

See also
Wilco (disambiguation)

Dutch masculine given names